The 2014 Collingwood Football Club season was the club's 118th season of senior competition in the Australian Football League (AFL). The club also fielded its reserves team in the VFL.

Squad

 Players are listed by guernsey number, and 2014 statistics are for AFL regular season and finals series matches during the 2014 AFL season only. Career statistics include a player's complete AFL career, which, as a result, means that a player's debut and part or whole of their career statistics may be for another club. Statistics are correct as of Round 23 of the 2014 season (29 August 2014) and are taken from AFL Tables

Squad changes

In

Out

Season summary

Pre-season matches

Regular season

Ladder

Awards & Milestones

AFL Awards
 Anzac Medal – Dane Swan (Round 6)
 2014 22under22 selection – Tom Langdon
 2014 22under22 selection – Jamie Elliott
 2014 22under22 selection – Jarrod Witts
 Member of the 2014 All-Australian team (Interchange) – Scott Pendlebury

AFL Award Nominations
 Round 3 – 2014 AFL Mark of the Year nomination – Jamie Elliott
 Round 6 – 2014 AFL Goal of the Year nomination – Dane Swan
 Round 7 – 2014 AFL Rising Star nomination – Tom Langdon
 Leigh Matthews Trophy nomination – Scott Pendlebury
 Leigh Matthews Trophy nomination – Dayne Beams
 Leigh Matthews Trophy nomination – Steele Sidebottom
 Robert Rose Award nomination – Nick Maxwell
 Best First Year Player nomination – Tom Langdon
 Best Captain nomination – Scott Pendlebury
 Madden Medal nomination – Nick Maxwell
 Madden Medal nomination – Luke Ball
 2014 All-Australian team 40-man squad – Dayne Beams, Scott Pendlebury

Club Awards
  – Scott Pendlebury
  – Steele Sidebottom
  – Dayne Beams
  – Heritier Lumumba
  – Brent Macaffer
  – Kyle Martin
  – Quinten Lynch
  – Tom Langdon
  – Travis Cloke
  – Scott Pendlebury
 Magpie Army Player of the Year – Scott Pendlebury

Milestones
 Round 1 – Tom Langdon (AFL debut)
 Round 1 – Taylor Adams (Collingwood debut)
 Round 2 – Nick Maxwell (200 games)
 Round 2 – Jesse White (Collingwood debut)
 Round 4 – Travis Cloke (200 games)
 Round 5 – Dayne Beams (100 goals)
 Round 6 – Jamie Elliott (50 goals)
 Round 10 – Dayne Beams (100 games)
 VFL Round 8 – Sam Dwyer (100 VFL games)
 Round 11 – 30,000 Collingwood goals (first VFL/AFL team)
 Round 11 – Alex Fasolo (50 goals)
 Round 13 – Tim Broomhead (AFL debut)
 Round 18 – Jamie Elliott (50 games)
 Round 19 – Tony Armstrong (Collingwood debut)
 Round 21 – Alex Fasolo (50 games)
 Round 21 – Jarryd Blair (100 games)
 Round 22 – Jackson Ramsay (AFL debut)
 Round 23 – Corey Gault (AFL debut)

VFL season

Results

Ladder

Notes
 Key

 H ^ Home match.
 A ^ Away match.

 Notes
Collingwood's scores are indicated in bold font.

References

External links
 Official website of the Collingwood Football Club
 Official website of the Australian Football League

2014
Collingwood Football Club